An adept is a member of advanced degree in certain occult, esoteric or philosophical organizations.

Adept may also refer to:
 Adept (band), a post-hardcore band
 Adept (comics), a superheroine in the Marvel comics universe
 Adept (Dungeons & Dragons), a class in the Dungeons & Dragons role-playing game
 Adept (C++ library), an automatic differentiation library
 Adept ICT, South African ISP
 Adepts, characters in the video game series Golden Sun with the ability to use Psynergy
 Adept Technology, a robotics, vision, automation controls company
 Magic Online Adepts, chat moderators for Magic: the Gathering Online trading card game
 ST Adept, a tugboat in service with the Admiralty from 1947 to 1957
 A trade name of the pharmaceutical drug icodextrin
 A trade name of the insecticide diflubenzuron

Acronyms
 ADEPT (medicine) (Antibody directed enzyme prodrug therapy)
 Adobe Digital Editions Protection Technology
 Association of Directors of Environment, Economy, Planning and Transport, UK
 Train Protection & Warning System, incorporating Automated Dead-End Protection Technology (ADEPT), an automated system for stopping trains when they reach a dead end